Donald Binchy (born 1963) is an Irish lawyer who is currently a Judge of the Court of Appeal. He was formerly a solicitor and was the President of the Law Society of Ireland between 2011 and 2012. He was a Judge of the High Court between 2014 and 2020.

Early career 
Binchy is from Clonmel in County Tipperary. His father Don was a solicitor who was the President of the Law Society of Ireland from 1990 to 1991. He attended Clongowes Wood College and received a BCL degree from University College Dublin in 1984. He qualified as a solicitor from the Law Society in 1987 and spent two years practising at a commercial firm in Dublin, Cawley, Sheerin, Wynne, practising in the areas of funds and re-insurance law. He subsequently joined the firm founded by his grandfather, Binchy Solicitors, in Clonmel. He was appointed solicitor to Clonmel Corporation in 1995.

In his practice, he specialised in particular in aspects of company and commercial law, in addition to administrative law and planning law.

He became President of the Law Society of Ireland in 2011 to serve a term until 2012. He had previously served on various committees of the Law Society prior to becoming president.

Judicial career

High Court 
Binchy became a High Court judge in October 2014. He was the first solicitor from Clonmel to be appointed to the High Court.

In the High Court he heard extradition cases including those arising out of the Essex lorry deaths and the death of Sophie Toscan du Plantier. He also heard applications for injunctions, and a commercial dispute involving Jedward.

In 2015 he granted an injunction against RTÉ taken by Denis O'Brien to prevent the broadcast of details of his personal banking arrangements contained in a news report. He subsequently held that what was said about O'Brien in Dáil Éireann was reportable.

Court of Appeal 
He was elevated to the Court of Appeal in March 2020. A vacancy arose following the appointment of Marie Baker to the Supreme Court of Ireland.

Personal life 
He is married to Claire Cusack with whom he has three children.

References 

Living people
Alumni of University College Dublin
Judges of the Court of Appeal (Ireland)
High Court judges (Ireland)
21st-century Irish judges
People from Clonmel
1963 births
Irish solicitors